Frances Ellen Burr (June 4, 1831 - February 9, 1923) was an American suffragist and writer from Connecticut.

Biography 
Burr was born on June 4, 1831 in Hartford, Connecticut and was the youngest of fourteen children. Her brother went on to publish the progressive newspaper, the Hartford Times.

Burr attended the 4th National Women's Rights Convention held in Cleveland in 1853. After getting enough petitions, she introduced a suffrage bill in the Connecticut General Assembly in 1867 that was defeated by a fairly narrow vote, giving her hope for women's suffrage in the state. In 1869, she was one of several suffragists to call for the first suffrage convention held in Connecticut. At the convention, she and Isabella Beecher Hooker founded the Connecticut Woman Suffrage Association (CWSA). Over the next 41 years, Burr would serve as the recording secretary of CWSA.

Later, she and Emily Parmely Collins started the Hartford Equal Rights League in 1885.

Burr was a contributor to The Woman's Bible, and one of eight women who wrote "special commentaries" for the book.

Burr died in her Hartford, Connecticut home on February 9, 1923. Her body was placed in a vault in Spring Grove Cemetery. In 2020, she was inducted into the Connecticut Women's Hall of Fame in 2020.

References

Sources 

 
 

1831 births
1923 deaths
People from Hartford, Connecticut
American suffragists
American women writers